Cross v Aurora Group Ltd (1989) 4 NZCLC 64,909 is a cited case in New Zealand regarding the Contracts (Privity) Act 1982 and pre-incorporation contracts.

Background
In 1987, Peter Cross negotiated a contract for property management services to Aurora Group, and planned to use a company structure for the contract.

The contract stated that it was "Cross Property Management Limited a company currently being formed", and soon after. Cross's lawyers changed a name of a holding company named Felstead limited, to Cross Property Management Limited.

Later, when the new company tried to ratify the contract, Aurora refused to accept it, and as a result CPM sued to enforce the contract.

Held
CPM's claim failed. Wylie J stated "Designation is a strong word, a positive word and means something more than a mere contemplation or possibility".

References

High Court of New Zealand cases
New Zealand contract case law
1989 in New Zealand law
1989 in case law